This is the list of prominent Armenian Revolutionary Federation members throughout history.

Founders
Christapor Mikaelian (1859-1905)
Stepan Zorian (1867-1919)
Simon Zavarian (1866-1913)

Fedayees

Sose Mayrig (1865-1952)
Aghbiur Serob (1864-1899)
Hrayr Dzhoghk (1864-1904)
Makhluto (1864-1956)
Andranik Ozanian (1865-1927)
Sebastatsi Murad (1874-1918)
Garegin Nzhdeh (1886-1955)
Karekin Pastermadjian (1872-1923)
Yeprem Khan (1868-1912)
Kevork Chavush (1865-1907)
Papken Siuni (1873-1896)
Soghomon Tehlirian (1897-1960)
Stepan Stepanian (1866-1915)
Arshak Djamalian (1882-1940)

Republic of Armenia (1918-1920)

Drastamat Kanayan (1884-1956)
Nikol Aghbalian (1875-1947)
Hovhannes Katchaznouni (1868-1938)
Alexander Khatisyan (1874-1945)
Avetis Aharonyan (1866-1948)
Aram Manukian (1879-1919)
Krikor Amirian (1888-1964)
Levon Shant (1869-1951)
Simon Vratsian (1882-1969)
Hamo Ohanjanyan (1873-1947)
Avetik Sahakyan (1863-1933)
Ruben Ter-Minasian (1882-1969)
Hakob Zavriev

Lebanon
Hagop Pakradounian (1956-)
Alain Tabourian (1964-)
Arthur Nazarian (1951-)
Vartine Ohanian (1984-)
Avedis Guidanian (1966-)
Alexander Matossian

Independent Armenia (1991-)
Vahan Hovhannisyan (1956-2015)
Hrayr Karapetyan (b. 1963)
Hrant Markarian (b. 1958)
Armen Rustamyan (b. 1960)
Giro Manoyan (b. 1962)
Lilit Galstyan (b. 1962)

References